Jesús Mario Acuña Fadul (1886–1931) was the Secretary of Foreign Affairs under Venustiano Carranza in Mexico from 1915 to 1916.

Biography
He was born in Coahuila, Mexico and attended the College of San Juan Nepomuceno in Saltillo. He was the Secretary of Foreign Affairs under Venustiano Carranza in Mexico from 1915 to 1916.

References

1886 births
1931 deaths
Mexican Secretaries of Foreign Affairs